Wayfaring Sons is the second solo album by the Scottish-Australian singer Colin Hay, released in 1990. The album peaked at number 118 on the ARIA charts.

Critical reception

The Calgary Herald wrote: "From Australia, basic pop music that owes a lot to what are allegedly the traditional sounds of Scotland." The Globe and Mail opined that "numbers such as the title cut and 'Ya (Rest in Peace)' offer the best fusion of traditional sounds and modern rock this side of The Waterboys." The Windsor Star concluded that, "like Men at Work, there's a hollowness about the music that keeps it from being anything more than mildly diverting."

Track listing
All songs written by Colin Hay, except where noted.
"Wayfaring Sons" – 3:31
"Into My Life" – 4:20
"Storm in My Heart" – 3:33
"Dream On (In the Night)" – 4:56
"Not So Lonely" (Hay, Robert Dillon, Paul Gadsby, Gerry Hale) – 4:16
"Don't Drink the Water" – 3:43
"Help Me" – 3:04
"Dreamtime in Glasgow" – 3:51
"Back in My Loving Arms" (Hay, Dillon, Gadsby, Hale) – 3:31
"Ya (Rest in Peace)" – 3:53

Personnel

Musicians
Colin Hay – vocals, acoustic 12-string guitar, acoustic 6-string guitar, electric guitar, E-Bow
 Gerry Hale – violin, mandolin, background vocals
Paul Gadsby – bass guitar, background vocals
Robert Dillon – drums, percussion
Robby Kilgore – keyboards
Jann Karam – background vocals ("Not So Lonely")

Charts

Notes 

Colin Hay albums
1990 albums
MCA Records albums